Orel (meaning eagle in some Slavic languages; also a common first name in Israel meaning Light of God in Hebrew) may refer to:

People
Orel Hershiser (born 1958), former professional right-handed pitcher
Vladimir Orel (1952–2007), Russian linguist

Places
Orel (Chrudim District), a municipality and village in Pardubice Region, Czech Republic
Orel, a village in Sveti Nikole Municipality, North Macedonia
Orel, Russia (Oryol), several inhabited localities in Russia
Lake Orel, Khabarovsk Krai, Russia

Vehicles
Orel (spacecraft), a Russian crewed spacecraft in development
Antey-Class SSGN "Orel", a guided missile submarine

Other
Orel (movement), a Moravian/Czech youth movement and gymnastics organization
Project 1153 Orel, a Soviet aircraft carrier project
Orel, a nickname given to French rapper and songwriter Orelsan
Orel Anzio, an Italian Baseball League club

See also
Moral Orel, a television show on Adult Swim
Oryol (disambiguation)